Heidi Williams (born 1981) is the Charles R. Schwab Professor of Economics at Stanford University and Director of Science Policy at the Institute for Progress. She is a graduate of Dartmouth College, and earned her MSc in development economics from Oxford University and her PhD in Economics from Harvard University. Prior to Stanford, Williams was an associate professor at the Massachusetts Institute of Technology. She is a member of the National Bureau of Economic Research.

Williams is an applied micro-economist who works on the causes and consequences of technological change in health care markets. Specifically, she studies economic and policy factors that affect medical innovation, and quantifies the impacts of "missing innovation" that could have been beneficial for human health and medicine. She is most well known for her work on the Human Genome Project. In her dissertation research, Williams shows that intellectual property held by the company Celera on human genome sequences had negative consequences for the development of scientific research and genetic tests based on those genes. In some other work, Williams and her co-authors show that pharmaceutical firms under-invest in research in early-stage cancer drugs because they take longer time to get to market, as compared to drugs for late-stage cancer.

In 2015, Williams was made a MacArthur Fellow, a grant given yearly to 25 people around the world to continue work in their fields. Her citation for that award noted:

In June 2021, Williams was a co-recipient of the biennial ASHEcon Medal, an award from the American Society of Health Economists for researchers aged 40 and under who have made significant contributions to the field of health economics.

Publications

References

External links 
 Heidi Williams bio at humsci.stanford.edu
 Heidi Williams at economics.mit.edu
 

Harvard Graduate School of Arts and Sciences alumni
MacArthur Fellows
Fellows of the Econometric Society
MIT School of Humanities, Arts, and Social Sciences faculty
Dartmouth College alumni
American women economists
21st-century American economists
1981 births
Living people
Alumni of the University of Oxford
21st-century American women